The Cathedral Basilica of Ciutadella de Menorca is a Roman Catholic church in Ciutadella de Menorca, in the island of Menorca, in Balearic Islands, Spain. It was constructed on the orders of King Alfonso III of Aragon "the Liberal", the conqueror of the island, in 1287 on the site of an old mosque.

History
Construction started in 1300 and was finished in 1362, creating a  building of the Catalan Gothic style, and is notable for the width of the nave, flanked by six chapels to each side. The five-sided apse is oriented to the east.

After the desecration and devastation of the cathedral by the Ottoman Empire Turks under Admiral of the Ottoman Fleet Pialí Bajá  in 1558 and the collapse of the vaults of the apse in 1626, the damage was quickly repaired in the original style.

In 1795, with the restoration of the old bishopric of Menorca (which had existed at  start of the 5th century) the parish church of Ciutadella came to be the cathedral of the new diocese.

Under Bishop Juano, the main façade was rebuilt in 1813 in a neoclassical style, contrasting with the Gothic style of the building, while the restored side door called the Porta de la Llum ("Portal of the Light") keeps some of its medieval ornamentation.

In the interior, the baroque chapel of the Angelus dates from the start of the 17th century with exquisitely-carved columns.

The cathedral was sacked and desecrated in the first days of the Spanish Civil War in 1936, but was restored in its current form by Bishop Bartolomé Pascual between 1939 and 1941. During this work, the Quire was moved from the nave to its current location in the apse.

Interior

The great altar is a marble monolith covered by a 15-metre-high canopy. At the back of the apse, under an image of the Virgin in the mystery of the presentation of Jesus in the temple, is found the episcopal throne, made with Roman marble blessed by Pope Pius XII to signify the links of faith and devotion of this church of Menorca to St. Peter's Basilica. In 1953 Pope Pius XII gave the cathedral the title of minor basilica.

From 1987, the seventh centennial of the conquest of Menorca by the Crown of Aragon, a new plan was undertaken for the restoration and development of the cathedral.

References

Menorca
Conversion of non-Christian religious buildings and structures into churches
Basilica churches in Spain
Former mosques in Spain
Churches in the Balearic Islands
Minor basilicas in Spain